Baloda Bazar is a nagar palika parishad in Baloda Bazar district in the Indian state of Chhattisgarh. Its PIN code is 493332. On 15 August 2011, it was declared as a district.  Baloda Bazar is also called Cement hub of Chhattisgarh because there are many reputed cement plants like Ambuja Cement Rawan,  Nuvoco Cement (Earlier Lafarge Cement) Sonadih, Nu Vista Cement ( Earlier Emami Cement) Risda, Shree Cement Khapradih, UltraTech Cement Hirmi, UltraTech Cement Rawan (Earlier Place Named Grasim), etc.

Geography
There are several tourist places in Balodabazaar like Sirpur, Turturia, Giroudpuri, Siddheswr Mandir Pallari and many more.

Education

The town has two government run colleges, one polytechnic college, a government run high school and over 50 private educational institutions. Some of the prominent schools are Ambuja Vidya Peeth, Vardhman Vidya Peeth, Gurukul English Medium School, Tata DAV Public School ( Located In Sonadih Nuvoco Plant), Sacred Heart Convent School, there is no engineering college at present.
Government Pandit Chakrapani Shukla Multipurpose Higher Secondary School formally known as Government High School was the main high school of the region established in the year 1948. It was inaugurated by Pandit Ravi Shankar Shukla.

Demographics

As of the 2008 India census, Baloda Bazar had a population of 27,853. Males constitute 51% of the population and females 49%. Baloda Bazar has an average literacy rate of 69%, higher than the national average of 59.5%; with 57% of the males and 43% of females literate. 14% of the population is under 6 years of age. Total area is about sq. 16 km. The main occupation of the people is agriculture and service in cement factories. It is a good source of cement. Basic facilities like schools, electricity, water, and hospitals are available. Government run D.B.D.K. PG college provides higher studies and a government run polytechnic College is also available at Sakari. Baloda Bazar has been a centre for education for the neighbouring areas for many decades. A number of private institutions have come up for the primary education and one law college is also running for many years. There is a temple of "Mahamaya Mata".

History
This town was known for its cattle market. The market still exists with name "Bhaisa Pasra". 
Purani Basti or the area adjoining the Mawli Mata Mandir is the oldest area of the town.
Freedom fighters like Bisauha Banjare, Veer Narayan Singh and Raghunath Prasad Kesarwani are also from Baloda Bazar. Some of the great personalities  from Baloda Bazar are  Late Dr. Saheb Lal Tiwari, Late Shri Satya Narayan Kesharwani, Late Shri Chakrapani Shukla, Late Shri Bansh Raj Tiwari, Late Shri Ganesh Shankar Bajpai, Late Shri Chandra Kant Dixit, Late shri Shankar dayal trivedi, Late Dr. Ramesh Kesarwani,Late Shri Santosh Kumar Bajpai etc.

References

Cities and towns in Baloda Bazar district

External links